Ram Ram Gangaram is a Marathi film made in 1977.

Cast
- Dada Kondake Gangaram
- Usha Chavan
- Ashok Saraf Mhamdu Khatik
- Ratnamala
- Anjana Mumtaz

Music
Raam Laxman composed the songs.

"Bakricha Samdhyashni Laglay Lala" - Usha Mangeshkar
"Mhora Ho Gangubai" - Usha Mangeshkar, Mahendra Kapoor
"Ala Maharaja" - Mahendra Kapoor
"Gala Varchi Khali Tujhya" - Usha Mangeshkar, Mahendra Kapoor
"Naki Doli Chhaan" - Usha Mangeshkar
"Gangoo Tarunya Tujh Befam" - Usha Mangeshkar, Mahendra Kapoor

Script
- Rajesh Mujumdar

External links

1970s Marathi-language films
1977 films
Films scored by Raamlaxman